Kill and Be Killed is a 1962 Spanish-Argentine crime film directed by Manuel Mur Oti and written by Enrique Llovet. Starring Olga Zubarry, and Alberto de Mendoza.

Plot
A former opera singer lives alone with her fortune and a housekeeper. Her daughter Elisa leaves prison and becomes a personal attendant and auxiliary nurse to the aging singer, a profession she has learnt in prison for the sake of reintegration. The old lady's only relative is her nephew Fernando. He comes to the big house every evening and plays the piano to her aunt's joy, and Elisa's too, who feels attracted to him. Fernando receives a monthly allowance, but it is not enough to pay his debts. Her aunt refuses to give him more, and Fernando approaches Elisa, and together they plan to poison her.

Release and acclaim
The film was produced by Argentina Sono Film in 1962.

Cast

 Olga Zubarry as  Elisa
 Alberto de Mendoza as  Fernando
 Luis Prendes
 Katia Loritz
 José Nieto
 Eugenia Zúffoli as Fernando's aunt
 José Bódalo
 Manuel Dicenta
 Luis Peña

Other cast
 Félix Dafauce
 Ana María Noé
 Porfiria Sanchíz
 Jesús Tordesillas
 Jorge Vico

External links
 

1960s Spanish-language films
1962 films
1962 crime films
Films directed by Manuel Mur Oti
Argentine crime films
Spanish crime films
1960s Argentine films
1960s Spanish films